The Goorudee Rivulet, a perennial river of the Murrumbidgee catchment of the Murray-Darling basin, is located in the Snowy Mountains region of New South Wales, Australia.

Course and features
The Goorudee Rivulet rises below Bulgar Hill, part of Monaro Range, adjacent to the Snowy Mountains Highway, and flows generally east southeast before reaching its confluence with the Murrumbidgee River, north of Adaminaby. The river descends  over its  course.

See also

 List of rivers of New South Wales (A-K)
 List of rivers of Australia
 Rivers of New South Wales

References

External links
 

 

Rivers of New South Wales
Murray-Darling basin
Snowy Mountains